Chu Ngọc Anh (born 9 January 1989) is a Vietnamese footballer who is a defender for Đồng Tháp.

In March 2014, he was involved in match-fixing scandal with his teammates at The Vissai Ninh Binh Club for an amount of VND 85 million.

References

1989 births
Living people
Vietnamese footballers
Association football defenders
Footballers at the 2010 Asian Games
Southeast Asian Games silver medalists for Vietnam
Southeast Asian Games medalists in football
Competitors at the 2009 Southeast Asian Games
Asian Games competitors for Vietnam
Vietnam international footballers
Nam Định F.C. players
Hà Nội FC (1956) players
Dong Thap FC players